Capenhurst railway station serves the village of Capenhurst and its substantial industrial facilities, in Cheshire, England. It also serves outer suburbs of Ellesmere Port.

Facilities
The station has platform CCTV, a 24-space car park and a cycle rack with 10 spaces as well as secure cycle storage for 20 cycles. Each platform has a waiting shelter with seating. There are departure and arrival screens, on the platform, for passenger information. There is access, to each platform, for passengers with wheelchairs or prams. However, cross-platform access, within the station, is by staircase only.

Capenhurst is one of four stations on the Merseyrail network that is unstaffed, the others being Bache, Little Sutton and Overpool. Passengers must purchase tickets from the Ticket Vending Machine located on the Chester-bound platform; the machine can issue tickets to any destination on the rail network. Passengers failing to purchase a ticket will be liable for a Penalty Fare if they board a Merseyrail service without obtaining a valid ticket. This station became part of the Merseyrail Penalty Fares Area on 15 June 2009.

Services
These services are all provided by Merseyrail's fleet of Class 507 and Class 508 EMUs.

Gallery

References

Further reading

External links

Railway stations in Cheshire
DfT Category F2 stations
Former Birkenhead Railway stations
Railway stations in Great Britain opened in 1840
Railway stations served by Merseyrail